Anurag Kashyap Films Pvt. Ltd. (AKFPL) is a film production company based in Mumbai, it was founded by director Anurag Kashyap in 2009. It is known for making art house or new wave cinema in Bollywood, like Dev D (2009), Udaan (2010), Shaitan (2012) and The Lunchbox (2013).

Filmography

References 

Film production companies based in Mumbai
Anurag Kashyap
2005 establishments in Maharashtra
Mass media companies established in 2005
Indian companies established in 2005